The following is a list of fictional United States presidents, N through R.

N

President Elaine Nakamura
 President in: Time Trax (TV series)
 By the year 2093 she is mentioned as one of the great presidents along with Abraham Lincoln and John Shaw.

President Gary Nance
 President in: Dave (movie, 1993)
 Succeeds to presidency upon death of President William Mitchell. Nance has honorable ethics and morals, is cleared in a scandal involving bank fraud. Alan Reed, a White House staffer instrumental in clearing his name, possibly becomes either his vice-president or chief of staff.
 Left a career in shoe sales to become a city councilman, wife usually manages his campaigns.
 Played by: Ben Kingsley

President Napper
 President in: Epitaph Road (novel) by David Patneaude
 He is removed from office in a one-day impeachment because of the military's faulty intelligence on a nuclear fallout in Los Angeles.
 Vice President James Corson assumes the presidency.

President Julian Navarro
 President in: The Brink (TV series)
 He is the first Latino president.
 In office a coup takes place in Pakistan, requires him to utilise a low-level foreign service officer to ascertain more information.
 Agrees to defend Israel should the radical-controlled Pakistan decide to use nuclear weapons against them.
 Quickly dismisses the efforts of Secretary of State Walter Larson's diplomatic approach to avoiding international conflict, and starts to side with the hawkish Secretary of Defense Pierce Gray, who wants to bomb Pakistani nuclear sites.  
 Evacuated from the White House due to fears it may become a military target, he is taken to a secret underground bunker beneath a Neiman Marcus department store. 
 Takes most of the credit for Larsons work on diffusing the conflict between Pakistan, Israel, Russia, France, Saudi Arabia, China and Iran.
 Played by: Esai Morales

President Jack Neil
 President in: Murder at 1600 (movie, 1997)
 Son is framed for murder to force his resignation for making military decisions his National Security Advisor does not like. The president has an (unproven) sexual reputation and has one son, Kyle.
 Ambidextrous, writes with his right hand, but swings (playing baseball and golf) with his left. Upon being told of his son's framing, punches out NSA Alvin Jordan with his right fist.
 Saved from assassination by NSA Jordan when Secret Service Agent Nina Chance jumps in front him, despite being handcuffed (she survives, Neil's guards kill Jordan).
 Played by: Ronny Cox

President Nelson
 President in: Scorcher (movie, 2002)
 Played by: Rutger Hauer

President D. Wire Newman
 President in: The West Wing (TV series)
 He is the last Democrat to be president before the election of Josiah Bartlet.
 He serves One presidential term.
 Spends his Administration propping up the House of Saud to ensure the flow of oil (similar to the Carter Doctrine).
 Appears alongside Bartlet at Lassiter's funeral.
 Party: Democratic
 Played by: James Cromwell

President Newton
 President in: Spartan (movie, 2004) starring Val Kilmer
 Daughter Laura is kidnapped by a sex slave ring that does not realize who she really is because her hair is dyed.
 Presidential advisers decided to fake her death to gain sympathy for his upcoming re-election campaign.

President Nguyen
 President in: Old Twentieth (novel, 2005) by Joe Haldeman
 A woman President in 2054, first name unknown (presumably a Vietnamese American, though this is not explicitly stated). Involved in the Immortality War (often known simply as "The War"), fought worldwide between the rich who can afford the Becker-Cendrek pills which makethen immune to dying of old age, and the others who can not afford them and violently resent it. As the country is already involved in a murderous second civil war in both 2048 and 2052, it is not clear by which electoral process put her in power. In 2054, President Nguyen leaves Washington, D.C. for a bunker in West Virginia, ahead of the city being sprayed with the Lot 92 biological agent, killing all of its twenty million impoverished inhabitants - a part of the worldwide killing of seven billion people, 97% of humanity, which leaves the planet in the sole possession of the rich "immortals".

President LaMonte Nielson
 President in: Empire (novel) by Orson Scott Card
 Is speaker of the House when president and vice president are killed by a left-wing terrorist group.
 Leads the United States in the Second American Civil War.
 Chooses not to run for his own term, instead opting to re-enter Congress.
 Party: Republican

President Howard Johnson Nissen
 President in: Give Me Liberty and Martha Washington Goes to War (comic book series)
 The former Secretary of Agriculture, he becomes President when President Rexall, the Vice President, and most of the cabinet are assassinated in an explosion. Well-meaning but ineffective, being manipulated by the evil Colonel Moretti who eventually murders him.

President John Milhous Nixon
 President in: Red Dwarf and Last Human (novels)
 Implements a policy to control the weather, which backfires, causing the eventual destruction of the sun.
 Sends Arnold Rimmer's son, Michael McGruder as part of a mission to colonize the Andromeda galaxy.
 Is a descendant of Richard Nixon and shares his middle name of Milhous.

President Winston Noble
 President in: Fahrenheit 451
 Described as extremely charismatic and charming and "one of the nicest-looking men who ever became president".
 President Noble defeats his homely and disheveled opponent, Hubert Hoag, in a landslide. Unlike Hoag, Noble does not pick his nose while on television.
 President at some point between 1960 and 2049.
 Society during his presidency revolves around promotions of hedonism, commercialism and anti-intellectualism (the last being enforced by the banning and burning of books). One consequence of such a society is Noble's election based largely on his photogenic appearance and pleasant-sounding name. This society is destroyed in a nuclear war that begins and ends on the same night, the only survivors being groups of exiled intellectuals who memorised books to preserve them.
 Party: Ins Party

None of the above
 President in: North American Confederacy (novel series) by L. Neil Smith
 President of the North American Confederacy, a libertarian state encompassing North America which succeeded the United States after a successful Whiskey Rebellion resulted in George Washington being overthrown and executed by firing squad for treason in 1794.
 Serves as the 24th and 28th president.
 Presidential term from 1969-1973 and from 2001 onwards, meaning that the office of the president was left vacant. 
 The office of the president is effectively abolished upon being elected President for Life in 2008.
 Party: possibly either Gallatinist (like all other Presidents since 1794) or Independent (the second after George Washington).

President James Norcross
 President in: Super President
 He has superpowers.
 Voiced by: Paul Frees

President Noxin
 President in: Schrödinger's Cat Trilogy by Robert Anton Wilson
 One of many presidents in the series.
 Although he appears in the novel, he is not technically a character, as he is a fictional character in a science fiction novel penned by a Harvard professor named Leary. (He is a clear parody of Richard Nixon, his name being 'Nixon' spelled backwards).

O

Acting President Douglas Oates
 President in: Deep Six (novel) by Clive Cussler
 Secretary of State, who assumes powers and duties of the office after the presidential yacht, the Eagle, goes missing with the president, Vice President Vincent Margolin, Speaker of the House Alan Moran and President of the Senate pro tempore Marcus Larimar on board. He orders a cover-up, with actors playing the president and vice President while he executes power.

President William Harvard Oaks
 President in: Dead Heat (novel) by Joel C. Rosenberg
 Is Vice President until 2016 when assumed powers and duties of the president after the president and most of the US Government are killed in nuclear attacks on Seattle, Los Angeles, New York City, and Washington, D.C. He is assassinated two days after taking office.
 Party: Republican

President Brian O'Brien
 President in: The Protectors (comic book series)
 Former masked vigilante known as The Clock.
 Elected in 1988 as an Independent.

The Office of the Other President
 President in: Avenue 5
 In the episode "Let's Play with Matches", it is revealed that the Office of the Other President is a council comprising legacy CEOs Beth Bezos (Amazon), Dusty Musk (Tesla) and Mike Zuckerburg (RealityWhack, formerly Meta) who ratify the decisions of the President of the United States. It was established in response to the third attack on Congress.
 TOTOPOTUS was initially willing to provide trillions to fund a rescue mission, later seizing control of Judd Mission Control after an attempt to shorten Avenue 5s extended journey time backfired. However, they decided to destroy the ship after Herman Judd, the CEO of Avenue 5s operating company, made public top secret knowledge that Earth was facing a lithium shortage.
 TOTOPOTUS is aided by a quantum supercomputer, which Head of Judd Mission Control Rav Mulcair had earlier approached for funding for a rescue mission.

President Desmond Ogilvy
 President in: My Gal Sunday by Mary Higgins Clark
 A former U.S. Representative from Wyoming.
 Is vice president to President Britland.

President Mehdi Ohmshidi
 President in: Phoenix Rising (novel series) by J.A. Johnstone
 He is a Muslim, and the first foreign-born president following the repeal of Article Two, Section One of the Constitution. 
 Becomes a dictator and serves as the antagonist of the novels.

President Oliver
 President in: Independents' Day (movie, 2016)
 He is killed by Aliens when they destroy the White House.
 Played by: Kurt Sinclair

President Howard Oliver
 President in: The Last Ship (TV series) (TV Series) (Season 3)
 He is the second African American president (as it is implied the incumbent president during the outbreak was Barack Obama).  
 He is the former mayor of St. Louis, where he presides over one of the most effective quarantines during the Red Flu pandemic, saving over 100,000 people. 
 He serves as vice president under President Jeffery Michener, who presides over the reconstruction of the United States after the Red Flu pandemic.
 After a reporter reveals details regarding President Michener's actions during his time as Secretary of Housing and Urban Development which accidentally aids the spread of the Red Flu, Michener apparently commits suicide (later revealed to be murdered by forces loyal to Shaw and the regional leaders), resulting in Oliver being sworn in as his replacement. 
 He becomes the victim of a coup d'etat masterminded by White House Chief of Staff Allison Shaw, who along with regional leaders across the United States plans to split the country into smaller nations, believing the federal government to be too weak to restore order to post-pandemic America. He is blackmailed into acting as their puppet, as unlike the former president, he still has surviving family members who could be threatened.
 He is rescued from captivity by sailors from the USS Nathan James, and temporarily operates a government in exile from an office aboard the ship.
 After the regional leaders and Shaw are either captured or killed, the divided United States Armed Forces are made aware of the illegal and traitorous activities carried out by the leaders, and the vast majority reaffirm their allegiance to Oliver as their commander in chief. President Oliver then makes a televised address to the reunited nation from the recaptured White House in St. Louis. 
 He leaves office some time before the start of Season 5, succeeded by Joshua Reiss.
 Played by: John Cothran

President Regina Oliver
 President in: Y: The Last Man (TV Series)
 Formerly the Secretary of Veterans Affairs under Republican President Ted Campbell, she was considered a 'fringe lunatic' even by members of her own party, being appointed to the relatively minor Cabinet position to appease Campbell's far-right swing voters.
 Whilst visiting Israel, a cataclysmic event occurs which simultaneously kills all mammals with a Y chromosome (except for amateur escape artist Yorick Brown and his pet monkey Ampersand), decimating the presidential line of succession and leaving Oliver the sole eligible claimant to the presidency (with Secretary of Education Abbott, the only other surviving Cabinet member, being disqualified due to being born in Antigua). However, because she was presumed dead as a result of the cataclysm, Democratic congresswoman and House Intelligence Committee Chair Jennifer Brown (Yorick's mother) instead was elevated to the presidency after being hastily elected Speaker of the House (a position she held for an hour).
 After emerging from a weeks-long coma, Oliver is reinstated to her position in the Cabinet as surviving government officials opposed and members of a caucus of surviving Republican lawmakers (led by Kimberley Campbell Cunningham, President Campbell's daughter) were apprehensive of elevating the radical Oliver to President, especially in light of rioting, infrastructure failure, shortages and internal displacement in the aftermath of the die-off.
 Oliver effectively becomes President after Brown is removed from power by the Cabinet and military for keeping Yorick's survival a secret partly to resolve the reproductive crisis, partly to prevent government collapse; this involved Yorick's bodyguard Agent 355 killing two helicopter pilots who helped rescue him from New York and smuggle him out of the Pentagon (interpreted either as being directly ordered by Brown herself or as the actions of a rogue agent). However, during a raid on the Pentagon led by Beth DeVille (Yorick's girlfriend who turned down his proposal of marriage just before the die-off) to gain control of its amenities, Oliver is taken hostage. Whilst trying to inform the raiders of Yorick's survival in a bid to be released, she is accidentally shot and killed, effectively liquidating the U.S. government.
 Played by: Jennifer Wigmore

President Patrick O'Malley
 President in: Night at Camp David (novel, 1965) by Fletcher Knebel
 He is vice president to president Mark Hollenbeck.
 He is accused of corruption over the construction of a stadium named in honor of President Kennedy.
 He becomes president when President Hollenbeck resigns due to mental instability.

President Vincent O'Reilly
 President in: Summit (novel 1987) by D.M. Thomas
 Former Movie Actor who meets with the new Soviet Leader.

President Janie Orlean
 President in: Don't Look Up
 A female president, who creates the "Don't look up" movement in response to an incoming comet while also trying to divert attention from a sex scandal. Eventually, her mishandling of the situation leads to the world being destroyed.
 Played by: Meryl Streep

President A. Thorton Osgood III
 President in: Mail to the Chief
 Played by: Randy Quaid

President Tommy Owens
 President in: The Essential Man (novel, 1977) by Al Morgan
 Elected in 1980, and re-elected in 1984.
 Has a massive stroke just before he is to take the oath of office for a second term on January 20, 1985.
 His staff organize an attempt to replace him with a lookalike, but the plan fails when the double becomes mentally unstable and is assassinated to cover up the truth.
 Replaced by corrupt Vice President Carl Kobin.
 Party: Democratic

P

President Sonya Paddock
 President in: Dead Rising 3
 Is similar in appearance to Sarah Palin, and shares her initials. 
 Married to Alan Paddock and has two daughters. 
 Becomes caught in the midst of a zombie outbreak during an official visit to open a museum in Los Peridios, California. 
 In the disarray caused by the outbreak within the city, President Paddock drops off the grid and becomes uncontactable, resulting in her dictatorial Secretary of Defense General George Hemlock to take over; he introduces strict media censorship and martial law in response to the outbreak. 
 Is later captured by special forces soldiers loyal to Hemlock, who kill her United States Secret Service bodyguards. Hemlock is revealed to be working with infamous bioscientist Marian Mallon, with the two wanting to consolidate their power by utilising a bioweapon derived from the virus to infect all of North America. 
 She is purposely infected and turned into a zombie by being exposed to the virus. Once infected, Hemlock orders his men to film her attacking and infecting a low ranking serviceman on live broadcast, and then shoot her in the head. 
 News broadcasts state she is 54 years old.

President Nathaniel James Page
 President in: Real Politics (online game) (2004–2008)
 Former Senate majority leader, elected president after George W. Bush declines to run again. He shocks everyone when he nominates a Democrat as his running mate during the 2004 campaign.
 Party: Republican
 Played by: Real politics game admins

President Andrew Palma
 President in: Geostorm
 First Hispanic president.
 A widower, he mentions that his late wife was a passionate and dedicated advocate for environmentalism.  
 Cabinet includes Vice President Miller and Secretary of State Leonard Dekkom. 
 Administration is responsible for overseeing the transfer of control of the Dutch Boy weather controlling satellite network from the United States to a global committee overseen by the United Nations.  
 Campaigning for re-election at the time of the film, with the campaign slogans "One World" and "United We Can". 
 Whilst attending the Democratic National Convention in Orlando, Palma is subject to an assassination attempt at the hands of Dekkom, whose men take control of Dutch Boy and use it to trigger a superstorm in the area. Dekkom plans to have the storm kill Palma and the rest of the presidential line of succession gathered at the convention, so he can be sworn in as president under the 25th Amendment. 
 Kidnapped and rescued from the plot by Dutch Boy assistant director Max Lawson and Secret Service agent Sarah Wilson. He later activates the biometric kill codes to reboot the Dutch Boy satellites and wipe the virus from their system.
 Party: Democratic
 Played by: Andy Garcia

President David Palmer
 President in: 24 (2001-2005)
 The first African American president, David Palmer is a native of Maryland. He attended Georgetown University and the University of Maryland and has two children, Keith and Nicole Palmer. Palmer cancels his re-election campaign after his ex-wife is killed in a murder-suicide in 2004. 
 After President Keeler's incapacitation, Vice President Charles Logan is unable to serve as acting president, and Palmer is secretly made Logan's proxy. Palmer is later assassinated by a sniper while working on his memoirs at his brother's penthouse apartment in Los Angeles.
 Buried at Arlington National Cemetery in Arlington, Virginia
 Previously served as a United States senator from Maryland, a U.S. congressman from Maryland's 4th congressional district, and a member of the Maryland House of Delegates
 Services as the 44th President.
 Party: Democratic
 Played by: Dennis Haysbert

President Wayne Palmer
 President in: 24 (2009)
 Serves only for three-and-a-half months in 2009.
 The brother of David Palmer, for whom he served as chief of staff and campaign manager.
 He was previously the Chief Operations Officer of Milliken Enterprises. His affair with the wife of its CEO escalated into the murder-suicide of both her and his brother's ex-wife. This compelled his brother to terminate his campaign and resign the presidency.
 Injured severely in an assassination attempt and Vice President Noah Daniels becomes acting president. He was briefly taken out of an induced coma in order to rescind a drone strike on a terrorist-held nuclear weapon, but then succumbed to his injuries.
 Daniels succeeds him soon after and serves out the rest of Palmer's term.  He then loses the election as made clear in 24: Redemption.
 Served in the United States Marine Corps Reserve
 Buried at Arlington National Cemetery in Arlington, Virginia
 Party: Democratic
 Played by: D.B. Woodside

President Harriet Palmer
 President in: Out of the Dark (novel, 2010) by David Weber
 Leads the U.S. government during the invasion of Earth by the extraterrestrial Shongairi. She and her cabinet are killed when the aliens destroy Washington, D.C. with an orbital strike.

President Pangwinn
 President in: the Simulations Publications Inc. wargame War in the Ice
 Defeats President Bradley in the 1992 election because of the war in Antarctica.

President Davis Park
 President in: Van Helsing
 Elected at some point prior to the start of the series.
 Has a son, Aaron, and an unnamed wife and daughter.
 On the day that the Yellowstone supervolcano erupts and blocks out the sun with ash, Park and his family are evacuated from Washington, D.C. to be taken to a bunker. However, while en route, their motorcades are overrun by some of the vampires taking advantage of the loss of sunlight to seize control of the country. Park's wife and daughter are killed, while Park himself is bitten and turned into a vampire. Unable to bring himself to kill his father, Aaron instead keeps him locked up in a cell, with the help of a biker gang acting out of patriotic duty.
 Four years later, Aaron meets Violet Van Helsing and recruits her help. Using the power of her family's genetics, Violet bites Park and turns him back into a human. While initially resistant to help due to being emotionally broken by his experience, Park eventually uses the Nuclear football to contact allies in the Pentagon and build a resistance movement against Dracula, who had killed and taken on the form of Park's successor, President Archer.
 After Dracula is defeated and all vampires are made human again, Park is reinstated as president and begins the rebuilding process.
 Played by: Stephen Lobo

President Jack Parker
 President in: The Election (novel, 1970)
 U.S. Senator from Florida running an independent campaign against Republican Pennsylvania governor Nelson Maynard, and Democrat Illinois senator Jimmy Harrington.
 When none of the candidates win a majority in the Electoral College the House of Representatives elects Parker after he cuts a deal with the governor of California for his State's support.

President Eldon Parker
 President in: The Oasis Project (novel, 1981) by David Stuart Arthur
 Once elected, states he will only serve one term, but secretly funds weapons program to create high-tech second generation shuttles and weapons to eliminate population centres worldwide and create a new Pax-Americana.

President Pete Parkin
 President in: The Prodigal Daughter by Jeffrey Archer
 Former vice president who agrees to serve only one term to gain the support of Senator Florentyna Kane of Illinois.
 Due to his being irresponsible and unavailable during a crisis with the Soviet Union, Vice President Florentyna Kane resolves the matter without backing down.
 President Parkin decides to use the success to seek a second term, and informs Vice President Kane she will not be on the ticket.
 Dies of a heart attack shortly thereafter.
 Party: Democratic

President David Payne
 President in: The Interim
 Serves eight years with high approval ratings.
 Clashes with President-Elect Candor over policies regarding a free Taiwan.
 Party: Republican

President Ambrose "Bud" Payton
 President in: The Godfather's Revenge
 Vice President to President James Shea.
 Former U.S. senator from Florida.
 President Payton assumes the office when President Shea is assassinated in 1964.

President Constance Payton
 President in: State of Affairs (TV series)
 First female African American president.
 Serves in the United States Air Force before entering politics.
 Serves in the Senate before ascending to the presidency, and joins several other senators on an official visit to Kabul, Afghanistan. However, the diplomatic convoy is attacked by terrorists during the visit and results in her son being killed.
 Married to First Gentleman Marshall Payton, who serves as pro bono counsel for advocacy groups. 
 Played by: Alfre Woodard

President Riley Peacham
 President in: Boomsday (novel, 2007) by Christopher Buckley
 Suffers low popularity, but is re-elected to a second term.

President Hunter Peale
 President in: The Hell Candidate (novel, 1980) by Graham Masterton
 Senator for Colorado, possessed by the Devil to start global war, exorcised by the Pope.
 Party: Republican

President Arthur Penn
 President in: One Knight Only (novel, 2003) by Peter David
 Sequel to Knight Life
 Arthur Penn admits to being King Arthur returned; his advisor Merlin circumvents the Fourteenth Amendment by having filed citizenship papers for Arthur in 1787.

President Pérez
 President in: Rendezvous with Rama (novel) by Arthur C. Clarke
 He is mentioned as having been president some time prior to the novel's setting (2132).
 A character in the novel does not remember whether it is Pérez or Harry S. Truman who said "The buck stops here."

President Castor Perryman
 President in: Black Star Rising (novel) by Frederik Pohl
 Mock-elected in the late 21st century.

President Joyce Peterman
 President in: Homeward Bound (novel) by Harry Turtledove 
 Part of the Worldwar series.
 Elected in 2020.

President Nathan Petrelli
 President in: Heroes
 In the episode "Five Years Gone", Nathan is shown as president of a future dystopian American state. His true identity is shown to be that of Sylar, the serial killer, who has presumably killed Nathan and used Candice Wilmer's power of illusion casting to take on Nathan's appearance.
 Nathan is also the president of a future America in the episode "I Am Become Death".

President Phillips
 President in: Air Collision, a (2012 Direct to DVD) Film
 On Air Force One with his wife and daughter when an EMP storm sends the plane on a collision with a Passenger Plane.

President Warren H. Pierce
 President in: Syphon Filter: The Omega Strain for PlayStation 2
 Bears a striking resemblance to and is based on George W. Bush.
 Party: Republican

President Stephanie Pilgrim
 President in: The Hatching, Skitter and Zero Day (novel-trilogy) (2016-2018) by Ezekiel Boone
 47th President of the US; also first female president and youngest president ever elected (four days younger than Teddy Roosevelt).
 Serves as a governor and senator prior to her presidency.
 Decides to destroy the whole infrastructure of her country (due to the so-called Spanish Protocol) and to nuke thirty-one American cities later in the story, to protect her people against an invasion of millions of carnivorous spiders.
 Faces a military coup against her, initiated by the chairman of the Joint Chief of Staff, Ben Broussard.
 Has an affair with her White House Chief of Staff, Manny Walchuck.
 Party: presumably Democratic

President Ulysses Delano Fitzgerald Milhous Pinky
 President in: Pinky and the Brain
 Known to his friends as "Ladybird"
 Is elected twice and impeached
 Party: Pink Party
 Played by: Rob Paulsen

President Olivia Caroline Pope
 President in: the ABC TV Series Scandal
 It is implied that she is the president by a presidential portrait of her shown in the final moments of the final episode.
 Former chief of staff to President Melody Parker Grant, and President Fitzgerald Thomas Grant III.
 Head of Olivia Pope and Associates, a crisis management and public relations firm.
 According to Chief of Staff Cyrus Beene, she may have become a de facto president (reminiscent of Edith Wilson, the First Lady to Woodrow Wilson) in what he describes as a 'bloodless coup'. President Fitzgerald Grant becomes dependent on her advice when she becomes his live-in mistress.
 Played by Kerry Washington

Acting President Powdered Toast Man
 President in: The Ren & Stimpy Show episode "Powdered Toast Man"
 Briefly acts as president after rescuing an unnamed sitting president
 Voiced by Gary Owens

President Katherine Powers
 President in: President's Daughter (novel series) by Ellen Emerson White
 First female president.
 Serves as a senator from Massachusetts prior to being elected president.
 In the second book, she faces an assassination attempt, and her daughter is kidnapped in the third.
 Party: Democratic

Acting President Jim Prescott
 President in: 2002 and again from 2002–2003 in 24 (2003)
 Jim Prescott is vice president under President David Palmer (2001-2005) and manipulates the Cabinet to invoke the 25th Amendment, but only serves a few hours before the presidency is restored to Palmer.
 24: The Game shows that Prescott once again serves as acting president following an assassination attempt on Palmer (24: The Game is set between Seasons 2 and 3).
 Party: Democratic
 Played by: Alan Dale

President Mark Prescott
 President in: True Allegiance (novel, 2017) by Ben Shapiro
 Has socialist leainings.

President Carl Preston 
 President in: Shadowrun role-playing game
 Presidential term 2041–2049.
 Defeats incumbent Martin Vincenzo in 2040 Election.
 3rd UCAS president | 49th US president.
 Defeated by Alan Adams (D) in the 2048 election.

President Jack "Kill the Commies" Preston
 President in: Whoops Apocalypse (film, 1986)
 Author of the book "Commie Bastards I have known".
 Party: presumably Anti-Communist
 Played by: Murray Hamilton

President Reginald J. Priest
 President in: Lexx (TV Series, 2001)
 Played by: Rolf Kanies

President Betty Jo Pritchard 
 President in: Shadowrun role-playing game
 Presidential term 2057.
 6th UCAS President | 52st US President.
 Speaker of the House Betty Jo Pritchard succeeds incumbent President Thomas Steele as president ad Interim on 19 January 2057, after the UCAS House of Representatives declares the UCAS Presidential Election of 2056 invalid, cancelling the second inauguration of President-elect Thomas Steele and his VP-elect. Pritchard becomes full president of the UCAS on 26 January 2057 upon the formal impeachment and conviction by Congress.
 On 29 January 2057, President Pritchard signs into law an emergency election to be held on the first day of August 2057.
 She is succeeded by President Dunkelzahan on 9 August 2057.

R

President Jeffrey Mindol Ragland
 President in: Ragland (novel, 1972) by Jerry Van Orsdell
 Former senate aid to future president William F. Berndt, and chosen to be his vice president.
 Becomes president when Berndt dies in office.
 Tried LSD, advocates sterilization for the poor, returns a Soviet defector to insure a summit meeting takes place.
 Threatens to blow up Air Force One with the Soviet and Chinese leaders on it during an airborne summit unless they agree to disarmament.

President Robert Rand
 President in: The Thor Conspiracy by Larry Burkett
 He is an erstwhile actor, chosen by "The Society".
 His policies dictated by "The Society" cause some states (including Wyoming) to revolt.
 He is assassinated (along with most of "The Society") by a South Korean who parks a van containing an atomic bomb in front of the White House (after which US capital is moved to Philadelphia).
 Thinks he is in control and "Society" operative Cho serves him—but revealed to be other way around shortly before he and Cho are murdered.

President Raney
 President in: Independents' Day (movie, 2016)
 Becomes President when President Oliver is killed by aliens.
 Played by: Fay Gauthier

President Lawrence Ivor Randolph
 President in: The Brady Bunch in the White House
 Former congressman & speaker of the house from South Carolina. Forced to resign.
 Presidential term 2009–2013
 Played by: Dave Nichols

President Eli Raphelson
 President in: White House Down
 Former Speaker of the United States House of Representatives.
 Hires Army sergeant John Cale to his Capitol Police security detail after the latter saves his nephew from an IED explosion in Afghanistan.
 Evacuated to The Pentagon when domestic terrorists bomb the United States Capitol and take over the White House.
 Sworn in as the 48th president of the United States after President James Sawyer is presumably killed in an explosion which destroys the White House cabana, and Vice President Alvin Hammond is killed when the terrorists gain control of NORAD missiles and shoot down Air Force One. 
 Revealed to have masterminded the attacks to place himself in power, with support from various members of the military industrial complex, believing that Sawyer's proposed peace treaty would "sell the United States out to the Arabs". 
 Has his co-conspirator, vengeful secret service agent Martin Walker, use his codes for the nuclear football in order to destroy the Middle East with American nuclear missiles.
 Orders an air strike on the White House complex in order to destroy any evidence of his involvement. 
 When Walker is killed and the Air Force pilots go rogue and refuse to carry out his order, evidence arises that points to him being involved with the attacks (his pager is set off by one of the cell phone numbers used by the terrorists). 
 Although confident in his belief that as president he will avoid prosecution and the claims will not be believed, Sawyer is revealed to be alive and has Raphelson arrested for plotting the coup d'état. Sawyer also assures him his "friends" who helped orchestrate the attacks will also be imprisoned.
 Party: Republican
 Played by: Richard Jenkins

President Rathcock
 President in: Machete Kills
 Runs for re-election as evidenced by his campaign television commercials.
 Party: presumably Republican
 Played by Charlie Sheen (credited as Carlos Estevez)

President Carlton Rattigan
 President in: Against All Enemies (novel, 1977) by Ben Wattenberg and Ervin S. Duggan
 President Rattigan orders U.S. Forces to South America on a peacekeeping mission. When an American base is attacked by rebels, Vice President Abner Hoffman challenges Rattigan for their parties nomination. Rattigan defeats Hoffman in the New Hampshire primary.

President Arthur Timothy Read
 President in: Arthur television series
 Arthur often imagines himself as president.
 In the episode "Arthur's Lucky Pencil", he signs into law a bill that mandates every student be served two pieces of Boston Cream Pie, at lunch.
 Voiced by Michael Yarmush in that episode

President Carl Reed
 President in: Invader (novel, 1980) by David Campbell Hill and Albert Fay Hill
 President of the United States when an alien fleet is discovered heading for Earth.
 Protested against the Vietnam War, but authorizes the construction of a Gamma Ray Cannon to use against the Aliens.

President Joshua Reiss
 President in: The Last Ship (TV series) (Season 5)
 Succeeds Howard Oliver as President some time between the end of Season 3 and start of Season 5.
 Declares war on the restored Gran Colombian Empire after they cripple the US military's computerized infrastructure with a virus and launch an unprovoked attack to destroy most of the recommissioned US navy.
 Clashes with Admiral Tom Chandler over his insistence on fighting at the front, believing both that Chandler is too mentally burnt out to lead, and that he is more useful as a public face for the war effort.
 Played by: Steven Culp

President Erwin Rexall
 President in: Give Me Liberty/Martha Washington Goes to War comic book series, set in 2014 
 Elected in 1996 (future date at the time of publication). The most popular president of all time (complete with his face on Mount Rushmore), Rexall repeals the 22nd Amendment to gain a third term.
 Vice President Cargo, and most of his cabinet are assassinated in an explosion, while Rexall himself is left incapacitated. Succeeded by Secretary of Agriculture Howard Johnson Nissen.
 Rexall eventually has his brain implanted into a robot body and is able to continue his presidency by the end of the series.

President Caroline Reynolds

 President in: Prison Break
 As vice-president, she collaborates with an organization known as "the Company" to fake the death of her brother Terrence Steadman and frame Lincoln Burrows for the murder. When her presidential campaign begins to falter and the Company turns against her, she has President Mills assassinated and ss immediately sworn in as president.
 Played by: Patricia Wettig
 Party: presumably Republican

President Richardson
 President in: Virus (movie, 1980)
 During his administration, in the then future Feb. 1982, the United States and Soviet Union both put in place the Automatic Response System (ARS), a computer system that is capable of fighting a nuclear war without human control.
 A biological weapon is stolen from a U.S. lab and, in an attempt to recover it, the virus is released in Europe resulting in a worldwide pandemic. The only survivors are in Antarctica.
 President Richardson dies at his desk from the virus shortly after informing those in Antarctica of the situation.
 The Chairman of the Joint Chief of Staff activates the ARS after the President dies, and an earthquarke a few months later causing a nuclear exchange that destroys the Antarctic colony.
 Played by Glenn Ford

President Dick Richardson
 President in: Fallout 2
 President of the United States in the 23rd century after World War III, although it means nothing more than leading the surviving significant government employees onto an oil rig, west of the city San Francisco. He is killed by the main character, the Chosen One, in the fall of 2242.
 Vice President is Daniel Bird
 Played by: Jeffrey Jones

President Elizabeth Richardson
 President in: Special Report: Journey to Mars (TV movie, 1996)
 Elected in 2000, and re-elected in 2004 due to her support of the Destiny Mission to Mars.
 In July, 2005, it is learned that the Destiny Mission has been sabotaged. Due to the heroic efforts of the crew the craft lands safely on Mars, but all contact is soon lost.
 Played by: Elizabeth Wilson

President Robert Richmond
 President in: Designated Survivor
 Born in Louisiana.
 Requests that Thomas Kirkman, his Secretary of Housing and Urban Development, resign from the cabinet after he is re-elected to a second term in 2016.
 Killed in the first episode, along with the rest of the presidential line of succession, in a bombing of the United States Capitol during his State of the Union address.
 Replaced by Kirkman, who is the designated survivor during the address.
 Is close friends with Kimble Hookstraten, a  congresswoman who survived the bombing by acting as the designated survivor for the rival Republican Party.
 Has one son, Tyler Richmond.
 Secret Service codename: "Eagle".
 Party: presumably Democratic
 Played by: Richard Bekins

President Allan Richmond
 President in: Absolute Power (1996 book) and Absolute Power (1997 film)
 Is an aloof, womanizing man who is cheating with his good friend's wife. After the sex beoomes rough, she attacks him with a letter opener followed by the Secret Service killing her. He and his chief of staff attempt to cover up the murder, however, a cat burglar witnesses the entire skirmish.
 Attempts, at all costs, to kill the man who possesses the letter opener with his blood on it.
 Book: A young lawyer later uncovers the scandal and goes public with it. President Richmond is later either impeached or resigns and is incarcerated. Later becomes the only American president to be tried for murder and executed.
 Movie: Burglar gives the letter opener to President Richmond's "good friend", who assassinates Richmond with it. Death represented publicly as a suicide.
 Played by: Gene Hackman

President Eleanor Richmond
 President in: Interface by Stephen Bury

President George Richmond
 President in: My Date with the President's Daughter
 President Richmond is married to Carol Richmond and has one teenage daughter, Hallie. While running for reelection, President Richmond is mistakenly arrested by the police and spends one night in jail.
 Played by: Dabney Coleman

President Kyle Richmond
 President in: The Squadron Supreme, a marvel Comic Book Mini-series
 A former costumed crimefighter known as Nighthawk, he is a member of the superhero group called The Squadron Supreme.
 He leaves the group and enters politics, first serving as a congressman, then a cabinet member, and finally as president of the United States.
 During his term an alien named Overmind secretly takes over his mind and forces him to conquer the world.  As no other country has atomic bombs in this timeline it happens quickly.
 President Richmond is seen as the Dictator of the World as Overmind stays behind the scenes.
 When Overmind is defeated, President Richmond resigns from office, but when the Squadron Supreme decides to take over the world and create a Utopia he once again becomes Nighthawk and opposes them.
 Benjamin Franklin, Hubert Humphrey, and Nelson Rockefeller all serve as president before Richmond.

President Prez Rickard
 President in: Prez, comic book series
 Created by Joe Simon
 Revived in several DC Comics series.

President Rick Rickard
 President in: Batman: The Dark Knight Strikes Again, by Frank Miller
 Is actually a hologram used as a front for Lex Luthor and Brainiac to secretly rule behind the scenes.
 His advisors include Attorney-General Snark, Secretary of State Robert "Buzz" Ruger-Exxon, and Chairman of the Joint Chiefs Four-Star General Cornell Starbucks.

President Ridgely
 President in: Franchise (short story) by Isaac Asimov
 Is elected in 1988 through "pie-in-the-sky promises and racist baloney". Is extremely disliked even 20 years later.

President Benjamin Riker
 President in: Falseface by Marilyn Sharpe
 Is killed by the world's greatest assassin who makes his death look like a skiing accident.
 President Riker is killed on orders from the speaker of the House who thinks he is too weak to deal with the Soviets.

President Henry Roarke
 President in: Quantico
 Native of Wisconsin. 
 Former United States Speaker of the House of Representatives.
 Ascends to the office after orchestrating the resignation of President Claire Haas. 
 Oversees the creation of a new arm of the US intelligence community, the Domestic and International Intelligence Agency (DISA). 
 Introduces a controversial Muslim Registry Act, and later conspires with rogue elements of the United States Government to orchestrate a terrorist attack on commercial airliners and blame it on innocent individuals placed on a list by the legislation.  
 Though this plan is foiled, he uses the fear generated to controversially request a Constitutional Convention in Philadelphia to drastically change and amend the Constitution of the United States in response to an increased terrorist threat. 
 Is later approached by the Russian Federal Security Service, who ask that he add a specific modification to a proposed amendment in the new constitution, should he receive the votes. This meeting however is secretly recorded and broadcast at the convention, with copies also being released to the ACLU, law enforcement and leading law firms across the country.
 With his reputation tarnished, and not wanting to answer to the press or law enforcement in the wake of the scandal, President Roarke commits suicide by shooting himself in the head.
 Party: Republican
 Played by: Dennis Boutsikaris

President Marcus Robbins
 President in: Sharknado 3
 Is saved by the hero of the movie series, Fin Shepard, when the White House is attacked by sharks
 Vice president: Sonia Buck (played by Ann Coulter)
 Played by: Mark Cuban

President Roberts
 President in: Captain Scarlet and the Mysterons episode The Launching
 Is initially suspected to be the target of a Mysteron threat, until it is discovered a nuclear-powered cargo ship, the President Roberts, is the real target.
 Played by: Puppet 46, voiced by David Healy

President Marshall Roberts
 President in: Ikon (novel, 1982) by Graham Masterton
 Blackmailed by secretary of state Titus Alexander into cancelling nuclear reduction talks with Soviets. But really only president in name, as Russians had secretly been in charge of the United States since 1962, when Kennedy surrendered to threat of missiles in Cuba.
 Reportedly intending to be re-elected in 1984.

President Peter Arnold Robinson
 President in: Alternities (novel, 1988) by Michael P. Kube-McDowell
 Presidential term 1972-1976.
 Aware of a series of connections leading to other timelines, Robinson escalates the Cold War to regain lost status and prestige, risking nuclear war with the expectation that he and his supporters can withdraw safely to another universe should events escalate.
 Is stopped by his chief of staff after government forces in his destination timeline seize the gate, preventing easy passage.
 Party: Republican

President Elise Rochelle
 President in: Coyote (novel) by Allen Steele
 Is elected President-for-Life of the United Republic of America by Congress.
 Commits suicide in 2096 to avoid being prosecuted for war crimes, as she had killed 1.1 million people with biological weapon strikes on Boston, Seattle, and Montreal.
 As the URA is later absorbed by the socialist Western Hemisphere Union after her suicide, she is essentially the final President of the United States of America.
 Party: Liberty Party

President Steve Rogers (Captain America)
 President in: What If, vol. II #28 (Marvel Comics) and The Last Avengers Story book by Marvel Comics (non-canon fiction)
 Party: New Populist Party

President "Steve Rogers"
 President in: Marvel 2099 titles
 The leader of a counter-revolution against Doom, "Rogers" claims to be Captain America, but is actually a pawn of the supervillain Herod.

President John Romero
 President in: Deadlands: Hell on Earth role-playing game
 Former film director and anti-Confederate propagandist. Conducts secret funding of the Latin American Alliance's war against the Confederate States of America. This revelation sparks another war between North and South.
 Romero is elected in 2070, impeached in 2078.

President George Romney
 President in: Resurrection Day by Brendan Dubios
 Elected in 1964, two years after a nuclear exchange sparked by the Cuban Missile Crisis.
 Re-elected in 1984.
 Party: Republican

President Ronnie
President in: the arcade game "Bad Dudes Vs. DragonNinja"
He is kidnapped by Ninjas and it is up to Blade and Striker to save him.
Based on the then current president Ronald Reagan in the arcade version.
On the NES port of the game, he is based on the then current president George H. W. Bush.

President M. Romney
 President in: fourth season Rick and Morty episode "Edge of Tomorty: Rick Die Rickpeat"
 Alternative reality version of the President from the "fascist dimension"
 Party: Fascist Party

President Romulus
 President in: Thank You for Smoking by Christopher Buckley
 Former president.
 Never is seen, but is referenced.

Chester Roosevelt
 Mentioned as a former Governor-General of the North American Union in The Two Georges, co-authored by Harry Turtledove and Richard Dreyfuss.

President Chet Roosevelt
 President in: Americathon
 Somehow becomes president at the age of 30.
 Prior to the Roosevelt administration, the U.S. government suffers bankruptcy, a few years later the nation holds a telethon to pay off its debts and deficit.
 Relocates the nation's capital from Washington, D.C. to Los Angeles, California.
 Falls in love with a Vietnamese pop star and resigns the presidency to marry her. The two later move to Vietnam.
 Played by: John Ritter

President Charles Ross
 President in: Last Best Chance (short film, 2005)
 President Ross has to deal with the possibility a terrorist has smuggled a nuclear weapon into the United States.
 Played by: Fred Dalton Thompson

President Pete Ross

 Ross is a former Senator from Kansas, succeeds President Lex Luthor after Luthor's impeachment, and refuses to run for re-election.
 Party: Tomorrow Party

President Thaddeus "Thunderbolt" Ross

 Ross was previously portrayed by actor William Hurt in the Marvel Cinematic Universe, but will be portrayed while in office by Harrison Ford in Captain America: New World Order (2024).
 Party: TBD

President Paul Roudebush
 President in: Vanished
 Played by: Richard Widmark

President Harriet Rowntree
 President in: Air Force One is Down
 Due to meet with members of the Serbian government to discuss their potential joining of NATO.
 En route to the meeting, Air Force One is digitally hijacked by English hacker John Mackenzie, and its passengers rendered unconscious by the release of gas via oxygen masks that were tampered with at Andrews Air Force Base. 
 The plane is remotely landed by Mackenzie, where the unconscious President Rowntree is kidnapped by members of the Serbian military loyal to renegade General Arkady Dragutin, who has just been sentenced to life imprisonment at The Hague. The plane is then returned to the air, where it is crashed into the ocean, creating a diversion and making it appear she has been killed. 
 Is held hostage by the rogue soldiers, who promise she will be released "unharmed" should Dragutin be released.
 Is later rescued from captivity and taken for medical examination at Ramstein Air Base in Germany.
 Played by Linda Hamilton

President James Roy Wilde (Jim Roy)
 President in: The Black President
 The first black president, elected in 2228.
 88th president.
 Preceded by President Kerlog

President Oliver Russell
 President in: The Best Laid Plans by Sidney Sheldon

President Jack Rutledge
 President in: Brad Thor (novels)
 Kidnapped by Swiss terrorist group known as The Lions. Has a finger cut off by the group as proof of his kidnapping. Later returned safely to the White House.
 Widower and father of a teenage (later college age daughter), who is injured in an avalanche during his kidnapping, and injured again several books later during an attack on NYC bridges and tunnel.
 Two term president, reelected sometime between the novels Blowback and Takedown.
 Party: Republican

President Virgil Rutledge
 President in: Hitler's Daughter (novel, 1984) by Timothy Benford
 Defeats Vice President Elliot Benedict, and follows President William Chandler into office.
 Vice President Leona Crawford Gordon becomes president when President Rutledge dies in the mysterious crash of Air Force One.

President John Patrick "Jack" Ryan

 President in: numerous novels by Tom Clancy, previously serves as a Marine lieutenant, CIA analyst and emissary, Deputy Director of Central Intelligence, and National Security Advisor.
 Because he is the first Marine to become president and in reference to a gift by a Saudi Prince to him, his Secret Service codename is "SWORDSMAN".
 Ryan is married and has four children, younger son is born shortly after his re-election.
 Jack Ryan assumes the presidency after the death of the president and most of Congress after a terrorist attack on The Capitol (ending Clancy's novel Debt of Honor). The Ryan Administration tries to significantly alter Washington politics by cutting through bureaucracy and political infighting, in part by encouraging "regular people" to run for Congress, who will serve their terms and return home, rather than professional, lifelong politicians whom he refers to as "a permanent ruling class" (throughout Executive Orders).
 Participates in the arrest of a terrorist mole in the Secret Service by helping the FBI run a sting operation in the Oval Office. The mole's fellow assassin's from Iran earlier raids the daycare center attended by Ryan's younger daughter, killing a teacher and several of little Katie's Secret Service Guards. None of the attackers survive.
 In foreign policy, the Ryan Administration fights two wars; the Second Persian Gulf War with the newly created United Islamic Republic, a union of Iraq and Iran, and the Russo-Chinese War, fought over Siberian oil (in The Bear and the Dragon). Not long before the latter war, Ryan has successfully pushed for an expansion of NATO to include the Russian Federation, in a futile attempt to deter a Chinese attack.
 Pronounces the "Ryan Doctrine"; this states that anyone who attacks American citizens anywhere in the world, no matter who they may be, will be held accountable by the United States.  This is consistent with Ryan's belief that "the safety and security of our citizens is ultimately my country's only vital interest".  The doctrine can be seen as a reaction to the rise of terrorist attacks on American citizens, including by the state organs of countries like Iran (or, in the book, the UIR). Iran's Ayatollah had masterminded the release of the Ebola Zaire virus in America's major cities, to neutralize the U.S. military while the UIR invades and crushes Israel. Despite this, the non-quarantined military reserves are deployed to the Middle East and thwart the invasion. Afterward, while Ryan is on camera pronouncing his doctrine, coverage flips to a palace in Iran, which is then incinerated by U.S. stealth bombs, killing the Ayatollah and his regime.
 Ryan refuses to run for a second term - a decision he regrets when the Democrat Ed Kealty is elected president and enacts policies to which Ryan strongly objects. In the next elections Ryan re-enters active politics, runs against Kealty and narrowly defeats him.
 Party: Independent / Republican. The Ryan Administration espouses many conservative, traditionally Republican beliefs, but Ryan is said to support candidates from both parties.  Ultimately, the integrity and loyalty of politicians matters far more to Jack Ryan than their party affiliation. However, the reference to the GOP winning Ohio and Michigan in Locked On implies that Ryan ran on the Republican Party ticket in the 2008 presidential election against incumbent Ed Kealty. This is reflected in the presidential debates, where there is only Kealty (the Democratic candidate) and Ryan.

References

Lists of fictional presidents of the United States